Elric! Gamemaster Screen is a supplement published by Chaosium in 1994 for the fantasy role-playing game Elric! that is based on the series of novels by Michael Moorcock about the character Elric of Melniboné.

Contents
Elric! Gamemaster Screen is a package of supplementary game material that includes:
 a four-panel gamemaster's screen that lists terrain modifiers, combat tables and other information that might be needed by the gamemaster
 a bookmark
 four reference cards on cardstock detailing important game systems rules
 a black and white map of the game world
 a 16-page booklet written by Les Brooks, Richard Watts and Gustav Bjorksten that contains an adventure called "The Curse of Chardros".

Reception
In the October 1994 edition of Dragon (Issue #210), Rick Swan questioned the relatively high price ($15) versus the usefulness of the material, and asked, "Do you need it? Only if the price doesn't scare you away."

References

Gamemaster's screens
Role-playing game supplements introduced in 1994